Sangramsinh Pratapsinh Gaekwad (born 6 August 1941) is an Indian former first-class cricketer and cricket coach. He is a member of the Gaekwad dynasty of Baroda and currently first in the line of succession to the unofficial title of Maharaja of Baroda.

Early life and family 
Sangramsinh was born on 6 August 1941 as the eighth child of Pratap Singh Rao Gaekwad, the last ruling Maharaja of Baroda, and his first wife Shantadevi. He has two brothers, Fatehsinghrao Gaekwad and Ranjitsinh Gaekwad, and five sisters.

Sangramsinh's brothers, Fatehsinghrao and Ranjitsinh, became unofficial Maharajas of Baroda after their father's death. After Ranjitsinh's death in 2012, Ranjitsinh's only son, Samarjitsinh Gaekwad, ascended to the throne.

He also secured control of Alaukik Trading Company and Baroda Rayon facility in Surat, and retained possession of Gaekwad Investment Corporation.

Personal life 
Sangramsinh is married to Asharaje Gaekwad who is from a Nepalese noble family; the couple lives in Mumbai and has two children. Their son Pratapsinhrao Gaekwad is the CEO of Baroda Rayon while daughter Priyadarshini Raje is married to politician Jyotiraditya Scindia of the Scindia family.

Cricket career 
Sangramsinh played first-class cricket for Baroda in the Ranji Trophy from 1960/61 to 1975/76. He appeared in 77 first-class matches as a top-order batsman, scoring 3,534 runs at an average of 27.60. He also played for West Zone in the Duleep Trophy and Board President's XI against visiting international teams.

Sangramsinh became a cricket coach after his playing career. In 2015, he started a cricket academy in Vadodara called "Prince Sangramsinh Gaekwad Cricket Academy". The academy, spread over 10 acres near the Akota-Dandia Bazaar Bridge, began operations with former Baroda cricketer Narayan Satham as its head coach.

Footnotes

References

External links 
 

1941 births
Living people
Indian cricketers
Baroda cricketers
West Zone cricketers
Indian cricket coaches
Gaekwad dynasty
People from Vadodara